This is a list of people with peerages of the United Kingdom created under the Life Peerages Act 1958 and Lords of Appeal in Ordinary (whose life peerages are created under the Appellate Jurisdiction Act 1876) who are closely related to one another, either by blood up to the degree of third cousins, or by marriage or cohabitation. This list is ordered by the antiquity of the earliest title each family has.

Those related by blood and marriage

Asquith/Bonham Carter
Aside from the hereditary Earldom of Oxford and Asquith, and Viscountcy Asquith, of Morley in the West Riding of the County of York, members of the Asquith, Bonham Carter and related families have been ennobled with the following life peerages: 
 Baron Asquith of Bishopstone, of Bishopstone in the County of Sussex (1951, Law Lord); 
 Baroness Elliot of Harwood, of Rulewater in the County of Roxburgh (1958, Conservative);
 Baroness Asquith of Yarnbury, of Yarnbury in the County of Wiltshire (1964, Liberal); 
 Baron Grimond, of Firth in the County of Orkney (1983, Liberal); 
 Baron Bonham-Carter, of Yarnbury in the County of Wiltshire (1986, Liberal Democrat); 
 Baron Razzall, of Mortlake in the London Borough of Richmond (1997, Liberal Democrat); and
 Baroness Bonham-Carter of Yarnbury, of Yarnbury in the County of Wiltshire (2004, Liberal Democrat).
Lord Grimond and The Hon. Laura Bonham Carter married in 1938.
Lord Razzall and The Baroness Bonham-Carter of Yarnbury became partners in 2008.

  Sir Charles Clow Tennant, 1st Baronet (1823–1906)
 Emma Margaret Asquith, Countess of Oxford and Asquith née Tennant (1864–1945) =  Herbert Henry Asquith, 1st Earl of Oxford and Asquith (1852–1928)
  Katharine Elliot, Baroness Elliot of Harwood née Tennant (1903–1994)
  Herbert Henry Asquith, 1st Earl of Oxford and Asquith (1852–1928)
 Raymond Herbert Asquith (1878–1916)
  Edward Julian George Asquith, 2nd Earl of Oxford and Asquith (1916–2011)
  Raymond Benedict Bartholomew Michael Asquith, 3rd Earl of Oxford and Asquith (b. 1952) Representative peer in the House of Lords from 2014, replacing Lord Methuen.
 Mark Julian Asquith, Viscount Asquith (b. 1979)
  Helen Violet Bonham Carter, Baroness Asquith of Yarnbury née Violet Asquith (1887–1969)
 Laura Grimond, Lady Grimond  née Bonham Carter (1918–1994) =  Joseph Grimond, Baron Grimond (1913–1993)
  Mark Raymond Bonham Carter, Baron Bonham-Carter(1922–1994)
  Jane Mary Bonham Carter, Baroness 
Bonham-Carter of Yarnbury (b. 1957) ~  Edward Timothy Razzall, Baron Razzall (b. 1943)
  Cyril Asquith, Baron Asquith of Bishopstone (1890–1954)

Cohen
Lionel Leonard Cohen was made a Law Lord in 1951. Janet Neel married James Lionel Cohen, Lionel's first cousin, in 1971. Janet was ennobled in 2000 after being Governor of the BBC. Their titles are
 Baron Cohen of Walmer in the County of Kent (1951, Law Lord) and
 Baroness Cohen of Pimlico, of Pimlico in the City of Westminster (2000, Labour)

 Lionel Louis Cohen (1832—1887)
 Sir Leonard Lionel Cohen (1858—1938)
  Lionel Leonard Cohen, Baron Cohen (1888—1973)
 Frank Lionel Cohen (1865—1955)
 Richard Henry Lionel Cohen (1907—1998)
 James Lionel Cohen (b. 1942) =  Janet Neel, Baroness Cohen of Pimlico (b. 1940)

Shackleton/Salmon
  Baron Shackleton, of Burley in the County of Southampton (1958, Labour)
  Baron Salmon, of Sandwich in the County of Kent (1972, Law Lord)
  Baron Lawson of Blaby, of Newnham in the County of Northamptonshire (1992, Conservative)
  Baroness Shackleton of Belgravia, of Belgravia in the City of Westminster (2010, Conservative)
^Nigel Lawson married Vanessa Salmon in 1955. They divorced in 1980.

Sainsbury/Havers/Butler-Sloss
The titles held by members of the grocer Sainsbury family are 
 Baron Sainsbury, of Drury Lane in the Borough of Holborn (1962, Labour); 
 Baron Sainsbury of Preston Candover, of Preston Candover in the County of Hampshire (1989, Conservative); and 
 Baron Sainsbury of Turville, of Turville in the County of Buckinghamshire (1990, Labour).
Michael Havers was made a life peer upon being appointed to the role of Lord Chancellor under Margaret Thatcher. His sister, Elizabeth Butler-Sloss, was later made a life peer upon recommendation by the House of Lords Appointments Commission. She was the first female Lord Justice of Appeal and the first female President of the Family Division of the High Court. She also chaired part of the inquests into the death of Diana, Princess of Wales and Dodi Fayed. The titles are
 Baron Havers, of St. Edmundsbury in the County of Suffolk (1987, Conservative) and
 Baroness Butler-Sloss, of Marsh Green in the County of Devon (2006, Crossbench).

Gaitskell and Wasserman
Latvian-born Anna Dora Creditor (1901—1989) was a life-long Labour Party member. In 1937, after divorcing her first husband, she married Hugh Gaitskell, who went on to become Minister for Fuel and Power, Chancellor of the Exchequer, and leader of the Labour Party from 1955 until his sudden death in 1963. After being widowed, Dora Gaitskell was ennobled with a life peerage. She remained in the Labour Party during the high-profile defections to the newly created Social Democratic Party. Her younger daughter, Hon. Cresidda Gaitskell (b. 1942), married Canada-born Gordon Joshua Wasserman in 1964. After a career as a civil servant in the Home Office, and as a consultant in the private sector specialising in policing, he too was ennobled in 2011. The titles are
 Baroness Gaitskell, of Egremont in the County of Cumberland (1964, Labour), and
 Baron Wasserman, of Pimlico in the City of Westminster (2011, Conservative).

  Anna Dora Gaitskell, Baroness Gaitskell née Creditor (1901—1989)
 Cressida Wasserman, Lady Wasserman née Gaitskell (b. 1942) =  Gordon Joshua Wasserman, Baron Wasserman (b. 1938)

Hurd/Cowdrey/Kerr
Four generations of the Hurd family have sat as Conservative MPs. The two middle generations have been given life peerages (Lord Hurd of Westwell notably serving as Foreign Secretary under Margaret Thatcher and John Major), and the youngest married the daughter of The Most Hon. the Marquess of Lothian and The Rt. Hon. the Lady Herries of Terregles in 2010. Lord Lothian also sat as a Conservative MP, and was given a life peerage upon retirement from the Commons. Despite already succeeding to his titles, he did so after the House of Lords Act 1999 removed the automatic right of hereditary peers to sit in the Lords, and so required a life peerage to be able to sit there. Lord Lothian married the 16th Lady Herries of Terregles in 1975. Her elder sister, the 14th Lady, married the cricketer Colin Cowdrey in 1985. Cowdrey was given a life peerage by outgoing Prime Minister John Major in 1997. The life peerages are
 Baron Hurd, of Newbury in the Royal County of Berkshire (1964)
 Baron Hurd of Westwell, of Westwell in the county of Oxfordshire (1997)
 Baron Cowdrey of Tonbridge, of Tonbridge in the county of Kent (1997) and
 Baron Kerr of Monteviot, of Monteviot in Roxburghshire (2010)

Brooke
Both Barbara and her husband Henry Brooke were given life peerages, as was their son, Peter. The titles are:

 Baroness Brooke of Ystradfellte, of Ystradfellte in the County of Breconshire (1964)
 Baron Brooke of Cumnor, of Cumnor in the Royal County of Berkshire (1966)
 Baron Brooke of Sutton Mandeville, of Sutton Mandeville in the County of Wiltshire (2001)

  Henry Brooke, Baron Brooke of Cumnor (1903–1984) =  Barbara Muriel Brooke, Baroness Brooke of Ystradfellte née Mathews (1908–2000)
  Peter Leonard Brooke, Baron Brooke of Sutton Mandeville (b. 1934)

Spencer-Churchill/Soames/Sandys
Clementine Churchill, wife of Prime Minister Winston Churchill, was created a life peer after her husband's death. One of their daughters, Diana, married Duncan Sandys in 1935 and they divorced in 1960. Another daughter, Mary, married Christopher Soames in 1947, who was later ennobled in like manner. Their son, Nicholas, was also ennobled. The titles are:

 Baroness Spencer-Churchill, of Chartwell in the County of Kent (1965)
 Baron Duncan-Sandys, of the City of Westminster (1974)
 Baron Soames, of Fletching in the County of East Sussex (1978)
 Baron Soames of Fletching, of Fletching in the County of East Sussex (2022)

  Clementine Ogilvy Spencer-Churchill, Baroness Spencer-Churchill (1885–1977)
 Diana Churchill (1909–1963) ≠  Edwin Duncan Sandys, Baron Duncan-Sandys (1908–1987)
 Mary Soames, Lady Soames née Spencer-Churchill (1922–2014) =  Arthur Christopher John Soames, Baron Soames (1920–1987)
  Arthur Nicholas Winston Soames, Baron Soames of Fletching (b. 1948)

Ardwick and Johnson
John Beavan (1910—1994), a left wing newspaper editor and Labour Party MEP, was ennobled in 1970. His granddaughter, Carrie Symonds (b. 1988) is currently engaged to Prime Minister Boris Johnson (whose father incidentally served as a Conservative Party MEP), who recommended his brother, the former Universities Minister Jo (b. 1971), to be ennobled in 2020. The titles are:

 Baron Ardwick, of Barnes in the London Borough of Richmond upon Thames (1970, Labour)
 Baron Johnson of Marylebone, of Marylebone in the City of Westminster (2020, Conservative)

Hogg and Boyd-Carpenter
Aside from the hereditary Barony and Viscountcy Hailsham, of Hailsham in the County of Sussex created for Douglas Hogg, four members of these families have been given life peerages.
Quintin Hogg, 2nd Viscount Hailsham disclaimed his hereditary peerage in 1963, allowing him to take up a seat in the House of Commons. He was later given a life peerage in 1979 when he was appointed to the role of Lord High Chancellor of Great Britain. His daughter-in-law was likewise ennobled for life as was her father. The 3rd Viscount was also given a life peerage, which enables him to sit in the House of Lords following the House of Lords Act 1999, which automatically excludes most hereditary peers. The life peerages are
 Baron Boyd-Carpenter, of Crux Easton in the County of Southampton (1972, Conservative);
 Baron Hailsham of Saint Marylebone, of Herstmonceux in the County of Sussex (1979, Conservative);
 Baroness Hogg, of Kettlethorpe in the County of Lincolnshire (1995); and
 Baron Hailsham of Kettlethorpe, of Kettlethorpe in the County of Lincolnshire (2015,).

Rayne/Vane-Tempest-Stewart/Goldsmith
The two daughters of the 8th Marquess of Londonderry connect two life peers; through marriage in one case through descent in the other. Lord Londonderry's elder daughter Lady Jane Vane-Tempest-Stewart married Sir Max Rayne in 1965. Lord Londonderry's younger daughter Lady Annabel Vane-Tempest-Stewart married Sir James Goldsmith (knighted in Harold Wilson's so-called 'lavender list'); one of their sons, Zac Goldsmith, was given a life peerage by Prime Minister Boris Johnson to enable him to stay on in the Cabinet after losing his Richmond Park seat in the 2019 snap General Election. The titles are
 Baron Rayne, of Prince's Meadow in Greater London (1976)
 Baron Goldsmith of Richmond Park, of Richmond Park in the London Borough of Richmond upon Thames (2020)

  Edward Charles Robert Vane-Tempest-Stewart, 8th Marquess of Londonderry (1902—1955)
 Lady Jane Antonia Frances Rayne, Lady Rayne née Vane-Tempest-Stewart (b. 1932) =  Max Rayne, Baron Rayne (1918—2003)
 Lady Annabel Goldsmith née Vane-Tempest-Stewart (b. 1934) = Sir James Michael Goldsmith (1933—1997)
  Frank Zacharias Robin Goldsmith, Baron Goldsmith of Richmond Park (b. 1975)

Jay/Callaghan/Hunt/Bottomley/Swann
The following life peers are related:
 Baron Swann, of Coln St. Denys in the County of Gloucestershire (1981)
 Baron Jay, of Battersea in Greater London (1987)
 Baron Callaghan of Cardiff, of the City of Cardiff in the County of South Glamorgan (1987)
 Baroness Jay of Paddington, of Paddington in the City of Westminster (1992)
 Baron Hunt of Chesterton, of Chesterton in the County of Cambridgeshire (2000)
 Baroness Bottomley of Nettlestone, of St Helens, in the county of the Isle of Wight (2005)
 Baron Jay of Ewelme, of Ewelme, in the County of Oxfordshire (2006)

Peggy Garnett married Douglas Jay in 1933, but later divorced. Christopher Garnett is married to the Hon. Su Garnett. Margaret Callaghan married Peter Jay in 1961. They divorced in 1986, and Lady Jay of Paddington has since remarried.

Lord Oakeshott of Seagrove Bay is apparently closely related to Lady Bottomley of Nettlestone, but it is unclear how exactly. Lord Hunt of Chesterton is related in the male line to John Samuel Hunt, as was Lord Hunt of Hawley, although this relation is very distant.

Wolfson/Rawlings
The titles held by members of the Wolfson family are 
 Baron Wolfson, of Marylebone in the City of Westminster (1985); 
 Baron Wolfson of Sunningdale, of Trevose in the County of Cornwall (1991);
 Baroness Rawlings, of Burnham Westgate in the County of Norfolk (1994); and
 Baron Wolfson of Aspley Guise, of Aspley Guise in the County of Bedfordshire (2010).

 Solomon Wolfson (1868 – 1941)
  Sir Isaac Wolfson, 1st Bt (1897 – 1991)
  Leonard Gordon Wolfson, Baron Wolfson (1927 – 2010)
 Charles K. Wolfson (1899 – 1970)
  David Wolfson, Baron Wolfson of Sunningdale (1935 — 2021) ~  Patricia Rawlings, Baroness Rawlings (b. 1939)
  Simon Adam Wolfson, Baron Wolfson of Aspley Guise (b. 1967)

Lord Wolfson of Sunningdale and The Baroness Rawlings were married in 1962. Their marriage was dissolved in 1967.

Wright and McDonald
Patrick Richard Henry Wright (1931–2020) was a diplomat and civil servant, notably serving as Head of HM Diplomatic Service and Private Secretary (Overseas Affairs) to two Prime Ministers, Harold Wilson and James Callaghan from 1974 to 1977. His only daughter, Olivia (b. 1963), married Simon McDonald (b. 1961) in 1989. McDonald is also a diplomat and civil servant, notably being the last professional head of the Foreign & Commonwealth Office before the creation of the Foreign, Commonwealth and Development Office. He was nominated for a life peerage in 2020. The titles are:
 Baron Wright of Richmond, of Richmond-upon-Thames in the London Borough of Richmond-upon-Thames (1994)
 Baron McDonald of Salford, of Pendleton in the City of Salford (2021)

Neuberger
Julia Schwab, who married Professor Anthony Neuberger, is Britain's second female Rabbi (serving at the South London Liberal Synagogue from 1977 to 1989). A former member of the Social Democratic Party, she stood unsuccessfully for Tooting in 1983. She was later ennobled in 2004, sitting with the Liberal Democrats, but joined the Crossbenches after being appointed Senior Rabbi at the West London Synagogue in 2011. Her brother-in-law was appointed a Lord of Appeal in Ordinary in 2005, and later served as President of the new Supreme Court of the United Kingdom (analogous to the position of Senior Law Lord).
 Baroness Neuberger, of Primrose Hill in the London Borough of Camden (Liberal Democrat, 2004)
 Baron Neuberger of Abbotsbury, of Abbotsbury in the County of Dorset (Law Lord, 2007)

 Albert Neuberger (1908—1996)
 Professor Anthony Neuberger =  Rabbi Julia Babette Sarah Neuberger, Baroness Neuberger née Schwab (b. 1950)
  David Edmond Neuberger, Baron Neuberger of Abbotsbury (b. 1948)

Those related by blood

Watson of Thankerton
Both William Watson (1827–1899) and his third son, William Watson (1873–1948), were high ranking judges. Each was appointed Lord Advocate, and subsequently a Lord of Appeal in Ordinary. The titles are
 Baron Watson, of Thankerton, in the County of Lanark (1880) and
 Baron Thankerton of Thankerton in the County of Lanark (1929).

The Barons Russell of Killowen
The title was created three times for father, son and grandson, all of them at some time Lords of Appeal in Ordinary. The titles are
 Baron Russell of Killowen, in the county of Down (1894);
 Baron Russell of Killowen of Killowen in the County of Down (1929); and
 Baron Russell of Killowen, of Killowen in the County of Down (1975).

  Charles Arthur Russell, Baron Russell of Killowen (1832 – 1900)
  Francis Xavier Joseph Russell, Baron Russell of Killowen (1867 – 1946)
  Charles Ritchie Russell, Baron Russell of Killowen (1908 – 1986)

The Barons Parker of Waddington
The title was created for father and son. Robert Parker (1857—1918) was a Lord of Appeal in Ordinary; his third and youngest son Hubert (1900—1972) was a senior judge unusually appointed to the role of Lord Chief Justice of England by Prime Minister Harold Macmillan. The latter's title was created under the Life Peerages Act. The titles are
 Baron Parker of Waddington, of Waddington in the county of York (1913) and
 Baron Parker of Waddington, of Lincoln's Inn in the Borough of Holborn (1958).

Younger
Aside from the hereditary Viscountcy Younger of Leckie, of Alloa in the County of Clackmannan (1923), two members of the Younger family have been ennobled for life. The younger brother of the first Viscount was a Law Lord and the 4th Viscount was given a peerage in the lifetime of his father, there being no possibility of a writ in acceleration as the Viscounts have no subsidiary barony. The life peerages are
 Baron Blanesburgh, of Alloa in the County of Clackmannanshire (1923, Law Lord)
 Baron Younger of Prestwick, of Ayr in the District of Kyle and Carrick (1992, Conservative)

 James Younger
  George Younger, 1st Viscount Younger of Leckie (1851—1929)
  James Younger, 2nd Viscount Younger of Leckie (1880—1946)
  Edward George Younger, 3rd Viscount Younger of Leckie (1906—1997)
 ,  George Kenneth Hotson Younger, Baron Younger of Prestwick, 4th Viscount Younger of Leckie (1931—2003)
  James Edward George Younger, 5th Viscount Younger of Leckie (b. 1955)
  Robert Younger, Baron Blanesburgh (1861—1946)

Keith
Both James Keith (1886—1964) and his only son, Henry Shanks Keith (1920—2002), were high-ranking judges. Both were Senators of the College of Justice and subsequently Law Lords, each taking the Scottish judicial title Lord Keith in 1937 and 1971 respectively, and then taking the following titles upon being made Law Lords:
 Baron Keith of Avonholm of Saint Bernard's in the City of Edinburgh (1953) and
 Baron Keith of Kinkel, of Strathtummel in the District of Perth and Kinross (1977).

Morrison and Mandleson
Both notable Labour Party politicians, Herbert Morrison and his grandson Peter Mandleson were given life peerages. Morrison held the position of Deputy Prime Minister and Leader of the House of Commons under Clement Attlee, later 1st Earl Attlee, as well as several other Cabinet positions. Mandleson was a key figure in the 'New Labour' movement and a close confidant of 'New Labour' Prime Minister Tony Blair, who appointed  him to several Cabinet positions, as well as to the position of European Commissioner for Trade. The titles are
 Baron Morrison of Lambeth, of Lambeth in the County of London (1959) and
 Baron Mandleson, of Foy in the County of Herefordshire and of Hartlepool in the County of Durham (2008)

  Herbert Stanley Morrison, Baron Morrison of Lambeth (1888—1965)
 Hon. Mary Joyce Mandleson née Morrison (1921—2006)
  Peter Benjamin Mandelson, Baron Mandelson (b. 1953)

Foot
Two of Liberal politician and solicitor Isaac Foot's children were given life peerages. Hugh was a British colonial administrator and diplomat, rising to the position of Permanent Representative of the United Kingdom to the United Nations. John, considered by his brother Michael (leader of the Labour Party from 1980-3) to be the best orator and the "ablest member of the family", was a Liberal politician. Michael refused a life peerage. The titles are:
 Baron Caradon, of St. Cleer in the County of Cornwall (27th October 1964, Labour) 
 Baron Foot, of Buckland Monachorum in the County of Devon (29th November 1967, Liberal) 

 Isaac Foot (1880—1960)
  Hugh Mackintosh Foot, Baron Caradon (1907—1990)
  John Mackintosh Foot, Baron Foot (1909—1999)

Bannerman and Michie
Both John Bannerman and his daughter Ray Michie were ennobled for life. Their titles are
 Baron Bannerman of Kildonan, of Kildonan in the County of Sutherland (1967, Scottish Liberal)
 Baroness Michie of Gallanach, of Oban in Argyll and Bute (2001, Liberal Democrat).

O'Neill
Members of the O'Neill dynasty (whose members hold the hereditary peerages Baron O'Neill, of Shanes Castle, in the county of Antrim (1868) and Baron Rathcavan, of The Braid in the County of Antrim (1953), and who are distantly related to the Chichesters (headed by the Marquess of the County of Donegal), Captain Terence Marne O'Neill and Onora Sylvia O'Neill were both ennobled as life peers. They are second cousins, sharing Edward O'Neill, 2nd Baron O'Neill as an ancestor. Terence was a leader of the Ulster Unionist Party and antepenultimate Prime Minister of Northern Ireland from 1963 to 1969. He was followed in these roles by his 8th cousin James Chichester-Clarke. Onora is a distinguished philosopher, former President of the British Academy, and member (and honorary member) of many other learned institutions including the Royal Irish Academy. She was also Chair of the Equality and Human Rights Commission, and is President of the Society for Applied Philosophy. Their titles are

 Baron O'Neill of the Maine, of Ahoghill in the County of Antirm (1970, Ulster Unionist Party) and
 Baroness O'Neill of Bengarve, of The Braid in the County of Antrim (1999, Crossbench)

Both are related in the male line to Lt-Col. Hon. John Chichester (1609–1643/7/8), son of Edward Chichester, 1st Viscount Chichester (c. 1568–1648), who is related in the male line to Marion Caroline Dehra Chichester (1904—1976), mother of James Dawson Chichester-Clarke, who followed Lord O'Neill of the Maine as leader of the UUP and who was the penultimate Northern Irish PM from 1969 to 1971. During the leadership election, O'Neill cast the tiebreaking vote in Chichester-Clarke's favour, although it has been suggested that this support was not due to a familial connection but rather politicking. Chichester-Clarke was later ennobled with the title
Baron Moyola, of Castledawson in the County of Londonderry (1971, Ulster Unionist Party)

  Edward O'Neill, 2nd Baron O'Neill (1839–1928)
 Captain Hon. Arthur Edward Bruce O'Neill (1876–1914)
  Terence Marne O'Neill, Baron O'Neill of the Maine (1914–1990)
  (Robert William) Hugh O'Neill, 1st Baron Rathcavan (1883–1982)
 Hon. Sir Con Douglas Walter O'Neill (1912–1988)
  Onora Sylvia O'Neill, Baroness O'Neill of Bengarve (b. 1941)

Janner
Both Barnett Janner (1892—1982) and his son, Greville Ewan Janner (1928—2015), served as Members of Parliament for Leicester West, Greville directly following his father. They were both subsequently ennobled with life peerages, which are
 Baron Janner, of the City of Leicester (1970, Labour)
 Baron Janner of Braunstone, of Leicester in the County of Leicestershire (1997, Labour).

Fraser
Ian Fraser was ennobled as a Law Lord in 1975. His son, a former Treasurer of the Conservative Party, was ennobled in David Cameron's Resignation Honours List. The titles are
 Baron Fraser of Tullybelton, of Bankfoot in the County of Perth (1975, Law Lord), and
 Baron Fraser of Corriegarth, Corriegarth in the County of Inverness (2016, Conservative).

Descendants of the 27th Earl of Crawford
Just under a year before succeeding to the Earldoms, Robert Lindsay (then styled Lord Balniel) was given a life peerage. It is notable that he entered the House of Lords in this way, as he could conceivably have entered by writ in acceleration using one of his father's junior titles (such as the Wigan Barony, or even the Lindsay and Balniel Lordship of Parliament, with which was then styling himself). Two of his first cousins were also ennobled for life, Baroness Manningham-Buller being the second daughter of Rt. Hon. Viscount Dilhorne, first holder of the most junior viscountcy. The titles are 
 Baron Balniel, of Pitcorthie in the County of Fife (1975),
 Baroness Nicholson of Winterbourne, of Winterbourne, in the Royal County of Berkshire (1997), and
 Baroness Manningham-Buller, of Northampton in the County of Northamptonshire (2008).

  David Alexander Edward Lindsay, 27th Earl of Crawford and 10th Earl of Balcarres (1871–1940)
  David Alexander Robert Lindsay, 28th Earl of Crawford and 11th Earl of Balcarres (1900–1975)
 ,  Robert Alexander Lindsay, Baron Balniel, subsequently 29th Earl of Crawford and 12th Earl of Balcarres (1927–2023)
 Lady Mary Lilian Manningham-Buller née Lindsay (1910–2004)
  Elizabeth Lydia Manningham-Buller, Baroness Manningham-Buller (b. 1948)
 Lady Katharine Constance Nicholson née Lindsay (1912–1972)
  Emma Harriet Nicholson, Baroness Nicholson of Winterbourne (b. 1941)

Vaizey
John Ernest Vaizey (1929—1984), an economist specialising in education, was given a life peerage in Labour Prime Minister Harold Wilson's so-called 'lavender list'. His son, Ed Vaizey (b. 1968), was a Conservative MP, and was given a life peerage by Conservative PM Boris Johnson in the delayed 2019 Dissolution Honours list.

 Baron Vaizey, of Greenwich in Greater London (Labour, 1976)
 Baron Vaizey of Didcot, of Wantage in the County of Oxfordshire (Conservative, 2020)

Maude
Angus Edmund Upton Maude (1912—1993), was a Conservative MP and rose to the position of Paymaster General. His second son, Francis Anthony Aylmer Maude (b. 1953) also became a Conservative MP and served in numerous cabinet positions, culminating in the roles of Minister for the Cabinet Office and Paymaster General. At the 1983 General Election, Angus stood down from the Commons (receiving a life peerage) and Francis entered Parliament. Francis was ennobled with a life peerage when he stood down from Parliament in 2015, and was subsequently appointed a Minister of State for Trade and Investment. The titles are
 Baron Maude of Stratford-upon-Avon, of Stratford-upon-Avon in the county of Warwickshire (1983) and
 Baron Maude of Horsham, of Shipley in the County of West Sussex (2015).

Lane-Fox
The titles held by members of the Lane-Fox family are
 Baroness Lane-Fox, of Bramham in the County of West Yorkshire (1981) and
 Baroness Lane-Fox of Soho, of Soho in the City of Westminster (2013).

 Captain Edward Lane-Fox (1874–1949)
 James Henry Lane-Fox (b. 1912)
 Robin James Lane Fox (b. 1946)
  Martha Lane Fox, Baroness Lane-Fox of Soho (b. 1973)
  Felicity Lane-Fox, Baroness Lane-Fox (1918–1988)

Gummer
Two of the sons of the Reverend Canon Selwyn Gummer (1907—1999) were ennobled. Both John (b. 1939) and Peter Selwyn Gummer (b. 1942) are Conservative politicians, with John serving as Chairman of the party, and as Secretary of State for the Environment. Their titles are
 Baron Chadlington, of Dean in the County of Oxfordshire (1996, Conservative); and 
 Baron Deben, of Winston in the County of Suffolk (2010, Conservative)

Palumbo
Both Peter Palumbo and his eldest son, James, were ennobled. Their titles are 
 Baron Palumbo, of Walbrook in the City of London (1991); and
 Baron Palumbo of Southwark, of Southwark in the London Borough of Southwark (2013).

Morris
Alf Morris, his brother Charles, and Charles's daughter Estelle were all Labour Members of Parliament. Alf and Estelle were both ennobled for life, their titles being
 Baron Morris of Manchester, of Manchester, in the County of Greater Manchester (1997, Labour); and
 Baroness Morris of Yardley, of Yardley, in the County of West Midlands (2005, Labour) 

 George Morris
 Rt. Hon. Charles Richard Morris (1926–2012)
  Estelle Morris, Baroness Morris of Yardley (b. 1952)
  Alfred Morris, Baron Morris of Manchester (1928–2012)

Hendy
Both John Hendy KC (b. 1948) and his brother, Sir Peter Hendy, CBE (b. 1953) were ennobled. John is a barrister, who often represents unions and union members, such as National Union of Journalists member Dave Wilson in the case Wilson and Palmer v United Kingdom [2002] ECHR 552. Lord Sir Peter works in transport, latterly as Commissioner of Transport for London, and currently as the chair of Network Rail. The brothers' mother is the youngest daughter of the 6th Baron Wynford, of Wynford Eagle in the County of Dorset (1829). Their titles are:

 Baron Hendy, of Hayes and Harlington in the London Borough of Hillingdon (2019, Labour)
 To be Gazetted

Those related by marriage
 Baron Llewelyn-Davies, of Hastoe in the County of Hertfordshire (1964) and
 Baroness Llewelyn-Davies of Hastoe, of Hastoe in the County of Hertfordshire (1967) married in 1943.

 Baron Castle, of Islington in Greater London (1974) and
 Baroness Castle of Blackburn, of Ibstone in the County of Buckinghamshire (1990) married in 1944.

 Baroness Stewart of Alvechurch, of Fulham in Greater London (1975) and
 Baron Stewart of Fulham, of Fulham in Greater London (1979) married in 1941.

 Baroness Ryder of Warsaw, of Warsaw in Poland and of Cavendish in the County of Suffolk (1979) and
 Baron Cheshire, of Woodhall in the County of Lincolnshire (1991) married in 1959.

 Baron Griffiths, of Govilon, in the County of Gwent (1985) and
 Baroness Brigstocke, of Kensington in the Royal Borough of Kensington and Chelsea (1990) married in 2000.

 Baron Howe of Aberavon, of Tandridge in the County of Surrey (1992) and
 Baroness Howe of Idlicote, of Shipston-on-Stour in the County of Warwickshire (2001) married in 1953.

 Baroness Maddock, of Christchurch in the County of Dorset (1997) and 
 Baron Beith, of Berwick-upon-Tweed in the County of Northumberland (2015) married in 2001.

 Baron Layard, of Highgate in the London Borough of Haringey (2000) and 
 Baroness Meacher, of Spitalfields, in the London Borough of Tower Hamlets (2006) married in 1991.

 Baron Hodgson of Astley Abbotts, of Nash in the County of Shropshire (2000) and
 Baroness Hodgson of Abinger, of Abinger in the County of Surrey (2013) married in 1982.

 Baron Gould of Brookwood, of Brookwood in the County of Surrey (2004) and
 Baroness Rebuck, of Bloomsbury in the London Borough of Camden (2014) were married from 1985 until Lord Gould of Brookwood's death in 2011.

 Baron Kinnock, of Bedwellty in the County of Gwent (2005) and
 Baroness Kinnock of Holyhead, of Holyhead in the County of Ynys Môn (2009) married in 1967.

Baroness Paisley of St George's, of St George's in the County of Antrim (2006), one of the first three members of the DUP to be made a life peer, and 
 Baron Bannside, of North Antrim in the County of Antrim (2010), one of the founders of the party, married in 1956.

See also
The title Baroness Ravensdale of Kedleston, of Kedleston, in the County of Derby (1958) was given to Irene Curzon, 2nd Baroness Ravensdale, of Ravensdale in the County of Derby (1911) to enable her to take a seat in the House of Lords as it was only after the Peerage Act 1963 that suo jure peeresses could sit in the House by virtue of their hereditary peerages. She was the eldest daughter of The Marquess Curzon of Kedleston, and therefore related to not only future Barons Ravensdale, but also the Barons and Viscounts Scarsdale.

Baroness Swanborough, of Swanborough in the County of Sussex (1958), who was the widow of Rufus Isaacs, 1st Marquess of Reading.

Baroness Northchurch, of Chiswick in the County of Middlesex (1963), who was the wife of J. C. C. Davidson, 1st Viscount Davidson.

Baroness Emmet of Amberley, of Amberley in the County of Sussex (1965), who was the eldest daughter of Rennell Rodd, 1st Baron Rennell.

Baron Beaumont of Whitley, of Child's Hill in Greater London (1967), who was in line to succeed to the Allendale Barony (currently subsidiary to the Viscountcy).

Baroness Masham of Ilton, of Masham in the North Riding of the County of York (1970), who is the widow of David Cunliffe-Lister, 2nd Earl of Swinton.

George Emslie (1919—2002) was appointed to be a Senator of the College of Justice, taking the judicial title Lord Emslie in 1970. He was later made a life peer with the title Baron Emslie, of Potterton in the District of Gordon in 1980. Two of his children followed in his footsteps to be appointed Senators, Derek (b. 1949) took the title Lord Kingarth upon his appointment in 1997, and Nigel (b. 1947) took his father's title, Lord Emslie, upon his appointment in 2001.

Baroness Tweedsmuir of Belhelvie, of Potterton in the County of Aberdeen (1970), who married the 2nd Baron Tweedsmuir as her second husband in 1948.

Baron Tanlaw, of Tanlawhill in the County of Dumfries (1971), who is in the line of succession to the Earldom of Inchcape.

Baron Charteris of Amisfield, of Amisfield in the District of East Lothian (1978), who was in line to succeed to the Earldoms of Wemyss and March.

Baron Howard of Henderskelfe, of Henderskelfe in the County of North Yorkshire (1983), who was in line to succeed to the Earldom of Carlisle.

Baron Silkin of Dulwich, of North Leigh in the County of Oxfordshire (1985), who was in line to succeed to the Silkin Barony.

Baroness Eccles of Moulton, of Moulton in the County of North Yorkshire (1990), who is the wife of John Eccles, 2nd Viscount Eccles.

Baron Cavendish of Furness, of Cartmel in the County of Cumbria (1990), who is in the line of succession to the Dukedom of Devonshire.

Baron Ridley of Liddesdale, of Willimoteswick in the County of Northumberland (1992), who was in line to succeed to the Ridley Viscountcy

Baron Onslow of Woking, of Woking in the County of Surrey (1997), who was in line to succeed to the Barony of Onslow.

Baron Waldegrave of North Hill, of Chewton Mendip in the County of Somerset (1999), who is in the line of succession to the Earldom of Waldegrave.

Baron Howard of Rising, of Castle Rising in the County of Norfolk (2004), who is in the line of succession to the Earldoms of Suffolk and Berkshire.

Baron Hamilton of Epsom, of West Anstey in the County of Devon (2005), who is in the line of succession to the Barony of Hamilton of Dalzell.

Baroness Chisholm of Owlpen, of Owlpen in the County of Gloucestershire (2014), who is the only daughter of John Wyndham, 6th Baron Leconfield and 1st Baron Egremont.

Baron Bridges of Headley, of Headley Heath in the County of Surrey (2015), who is in the line of succession to the Barony of Bridges.

Lady Arden of Heswall (2018), entitled to be "designated by the courtesy style and title...of "Lady"" by Royal Warrant as a Supreme Court Justice, married Baron Mance, of Frognal in the London Borough of Camden (2005) in 1973, whom she replaced on the Supreme Court when he retired. While explicitly not a life peerage, but a judicial title similar to those held by the Senators of the College of Justice, she would have received a life peerage under the Appellate Jurisdiction Acts had she theoretically been made a Lord of Appeal in Ordinary before the creation of the Supreme Court under the Constitutional Reform Act 2005, as her husband was.

References

Life peers
Peers of the United Kingdom
Lists of British nobility